The acronym ENSCM may refer to:

 École nationale supérieure de chimie de Montpellier
 École nationale supérieure de chronométrie et de mécanique